Diavolo, the Italian word for devil, may refer to:

Diavolo Dance Theater, an American dance company
Diavolo, a character in Golden Wind, a story line in the Japanese manga series JoJo's Bizarre Adventure
Il diavolo, a 1963 Italian film
Il diavolo, a tarot card in the Tarocco Piemontese
Nikolai Diavolo, a fictional character from the 2003 videogame James Bond 007: Everything or Nothing

See also
Diabolo (disambiguation)
Fra Diavolo (disambiguation)